Slick Chick is a single player wedge head pinball machine designed by Wayne Neyens and released by Gottlieb in January 27, 1963. It features a Playboy influenced theme.

Gameplay
The playfield contains five pop bumpers and four scoring bumpers. Spelling "Slick Chick" five times lights specials. One through four rollovers light a second special. The gobble hole awards 100 points and one rollover. The end of game match awards one replay.

Design team
 Concept: Wayne Neyens
 Game Design: Wayne Neyens
 Mechanics: Wayne Neyens
 Artwork: Roy Parker
 Animation: Wayne Neyens

Digital version
The table was virtually recreated in the pinball simulation video game, Microsoft Pinball Arcade.

References

External links
 Slick Chick at the Internet Pinball Database

Gottlieb pinball machines
1963 pinball machines